Dasht-e Azadegan (also Romanized as Dasht-e Āzādegān) is a village in Mashayekh Rural District, Doshman Ziari District, Mamasani County, Fars Province, Iran. At the 2006 census, its population was 1,339, made up of 308 families.

References 

Populated places in Mamasani County